This is a list of cocaine analogues. A cocaine analogue is an (usually) artificial construct of a novel chemical compound from (often the starting point of natural) cocaine's molecular structure, with the result product sufficiently similar to cocaine to display similarity in, but alteration to, its chemical function. Within the scope of analogous compounds created from the structure of cocaine, so named "cocaine analogues" retain 3β-benzoyloxy or similar functionality (the term specifically used usually distinguishes from phenyltropanes, but in the broad sense generally, as a category, includes them) on a tropane skeleton, as compared to other stimulants of the kind. Many of the semi-synthetic cocaine analogues proper which have been made & studied have consisted of among the nine following classes of compounds:
 stereoisomers of cocaine
 3β-phenyl ring substituted analogues
 2β-substituted analogues
 N-modified analogues of cocaine
 3β-carbamoyl analogues
 3β-alkyl-3-benzyl tropanes
 6/7-substituted cocaines
 6-alkyl-3-benzyl tropanes
 piperidine homologues of cocaine

However strict analogues of cocaine would also include such other potential combinations as phenacyltropanes & other carbon branched replacements not listed above. The term may also be loosely used to refer to drugs manufactured from cocaine or having their basis as a total synthesis of cocaine, but modified to alter their effect & QSAR. These include both intracellular sodium channel blocker anaesthetics and stimulant dopamine reuptake inhibitor ligands (such as certain, namely tropane-bridged-excised, piperidines). Additionally, researchers have supported combinatorial approaches for taking the most promising analogues currently elucidated and mixing them to the end of discovering novel & efficacious compounds to optimize their utilization for differing distinct specified purposes.

Analogs sensu stricto

Cocaine Stereoisomers

There are eight stereoisomers of cocaine (excluding mesomers and modifications to the internal portion of the tropane ring). Due to the presence of four asymmetric carbon atoms in the 1- & 5- to 8 (N) position bond bridge that could adopt R- & S- configurations, cocaine can be considered to have as many as sixteen stereoisomers. However, geometric constraints imparted by the bridgehead amine allow only eight to be created. 

The natural isomerism of cocaine is unstable and prone to epimerization. For example, the end product of cocaine biosynthesis contains an axial C2-carbomethoxy moiety which readily undergoes epimerization to the equatorial position via saponification.

For any 2D structural diagrams where stereochemistry is not indicated, it should be assumed the analogue depicted shares the stereochemical conformation of R-cocaine unless noted otherwise.

Arene benzene-ring 2′, 3′, 4′ (5′ & 6′) position (aryl) substitutions

para-substituted benzoylmethylecgonines

The MAT binding pocket analogous to the lipophilic place on cocaine-like compounds, inclusive of the benzene ring, is approximate to 9 Å in length. Which is only slightly larger than a phenyl ring by itself.

meta-substituted benzoylmethylecgonines

ɑIC50 value for displacement of [3H]cocaine

ortho-substituted benzoylmethylecgonines

ɑIC50 value for displacement of [3H]cocaine

The hydroxylated 2′-OH analogue exhibited a tenfold increase in potency over cocaine.

Manifold and termination benzoyloxy phenyl-substitutions

Multi-substitutions (substitutions of substitutions; e.g. meta- & para-) or manifold ("many-fold") substituted analogues are analogues where more than one modification from the parent molecule takes place (having numerous intermediary constituents). These are created with often surprising structure–activity relationship results extrapolated therefrom. It is even a common case where two separate substitutions can each yield a weaker, lower affinity or even wholly non-efficacious compound respectively; but due to findings that oftentimes, when used together, such two mutually inferior changes being added in tandem to one analogue has the potential to make the resultant derivative display much greater efficacy, affinity, selectivity &/or strength than even the parent compound; which otherwise was compromised by either of those two alternations when made alone.

Benzoyl and carbomethoxy branch modifications
 
 Benzoylthiomethylecgonine

A sulfur in place of the oxygen at the benzoyl ester single bond results in a lower electronegativity than that of cocaine.

 Cocaine reverse ester (REC)

REC is a cocaine analogue which contains a "reversed" C2 carbomethoxy moiety. In animal studies, REC lacked cocaine-like stimulant effects.

C1-tropane-ring hydrogen—substitutions

ɑ, P < 0.05 compared with (—)-cocaine (one-way ANOVA followed by Dunnett's multiple comparisons test)
b, P < 0.01 compared with (—)-cocaine (one-way ANOVA followed by Dunnett's multiple comparisons test)
cLidocaine was found to have a value of 39.6 ± 2.4, the weakest of all tested.
dSame reference gives 25.9 ± 2.4 μM for (+)-cocaine and 13.6 ± 1.3 μM for norcocaine. Comparably it gives 12.7 ± 1.5 μM for the sigmaergic affinity of (+)-amphetamine. Another reference gives 1.7-6.7 μM for (—)-cocaine. All values Ki.
Using same data-set as above table, the following compounds were found to compare as:
CFT @ DAT = 39.2 ± 7.1 (n = 5)
fluoxetine @ SERT = 27.3 ± 9.2 (n = 3)
desipramine @ NET = 2.74 ± 0.59 (n = 3)
Cocaine analogs substituting the C1-tropane ring position, requiring sulfinimine (N-sulfinyl-imine) chemistry (before the innovation of which were untenable) which bind unlike the typical configuration at DAT (open to out) as cocaine (with its terminal D79-Y156 distance of 6.03 Å), or in the atypical (closed to out) conformation of the benztropines (3.29 Å). Though closer to the open to out: (—)-1-methyl-cocaine = 4.40 Å & (—)-1-phenyl-cocaine = 4.89 Å, and exhibiting preferential interaction with outward facing DAT conformation, they appear to have the lack of behavioral stimulation as-like the closed to out type. Despite having non-stimulant behavior profiles, they still seem to have anti-depressant behavioral profiles.

The C1 phenyl analog is ten times stronger than cocaine as a dopamine reuptake pump ligand, and twenty four times stronger as a local anesthetic (voltage-dependent Na+ channel blocker), whereas the C1 methyl analog is 2.3 times less potent as a local anesthetic.

cf. hydroxytropacocaine for a natural alkaloid (lacking however, the 2-position carbmethoxy) that is a C1 substituent with a hydroxy group.

2β-substitutions

Compounds 196e-h possess greater SERT affinity than cocaine, but possess weaker NET/DAT affinities (with the exception of 196g at NET). Compounds 196k, 196n, 196o, and 197c all possess greater DAT affinity than cocaine. Compound 197b (dimethyl amide) displayed a 1,131-fold increased selectivity in affinity over the serotonin transporter, with only slight reductions in potency for the dopamine & norepinephrine transporters. Whereas 197c (Weinreb amide, N-methoxy-N-methyl amide) had a 469× increase at SERT, with greater affinity for DAT than cocaine and an equal NET affinity. 197b was 137×, and 196c 27× less potent at binding to the serotonin transporter, but both had a NET / DAT ratio that made for a better dopaminergic than cocaine. The consideration that large, bulky C2 substituents would alter the spatial conformation of the tropane ring system by distorting the piperidine portion of the system and thus hamper binding appears to be unfounded. 

Benzoylecgonine (197e) is the inactive primary metabolite of cocaine generated through hydrolysis of the C2 methyl ester. In vitro binding studies indicate that benzoylecgonine is ~2,200x less potent than cocaine at the dopamine transporter, possibly due to zwitterion formation preventing strong DAT binding. In contrast to in vitro studies, the lack of activity observed in in vivo studies is likely the result of reduced blood–brain barrier penetration than formation of a zwitterion.

Bioisostere 2-position carbmethoxy-ester functional replacements

Vinylogous 2β-position carbmethoxy-ester functional replacements

Compounds 201b & 201c were significantly more potent than cocaine while compounds 201a, 201d & 201e were significantly less potent. This finding indicates that the presence of a hydrogen bond acceptor (i.e. carbomethoxy) at the 2β position is not absolutely necessary for the creation of high affinity cocaine analogues.

N-modifications

ɑIC50 (nM) for displacement of [3H]WIN 35428

Tricyclic cocaine analogues

8 to 2 tethered analogues

See N-front & back bridged phenyltropanes.

Back-bridged cocaine analogues are considered more akin to untethered cocaine analogs & phenyltropane derivatives (where the nitrogen lone pair is not fixed or constrained) and better mimics their affinities. This is due to when the eighth carbon tropane position is freely rotatable and unbound it preferably occupies the axial position as defining its least energy & most unhindered state. In front-bridged analogs the nitrogen lone pairings rigid fixity makes it reside in an equatorial placing for the piperidine ring-part of the tropane nucleus, pointing to the two-carbon & three methylene unit bridgehead; giving the attested front-bridged cocaine analogues preference for SERT over DAT.

8 to 3 tethered analogues 

"N/T" = "not tested"

Tropane ring contraction (azabornane) analogues

6/7 tropane position methoxycocaine & methoxypseudococaine analogues

3β-position 2′—(6′) & 2β-substitution combination analogues

ɑFor displacement of [3H]paroxetine (5-HTT & NET)
bFor displacement of [3H]nisoxetine (5-HTT & NET)

3β-Carbamoyl analogues

Phenyl 3-position linkage substitutions
See: List of phenyltropanes (Many phenyltropanes are derived from cocaine metabolites, such as methylecgonidine, as precursors. Whereas fully synthetic methods have been devised from the starting material of vinylcarbenoids & pyrroles.)

The difference in the length of the benzoyloxy and the phenyl linkage contrasted between cocaine and phenyltropanes makes for a shorter distance between the centroid of the aromatic benzene and the bridge nitrogen of the tropane in the latter PTs. This distance being on a scale of 5.6 Å for phenyltropanes and 7.7 Å for cocaine or analogs with the benzoyloxy intact. This may account for PTs increased behavioral stimulation profile over cocaine. Differences in binding potency have also been explained considering solvation effects; cocaine containing 2β,3β-ester groups being calculated as more solvated than the WIN-type compounds (i.e. troparil). Higher pKɑs of the tropane nitrogen (8.65 for cocaine, 9.55 for troparil & 11.95 for vinyl analogue 43a), decreased aqueous solvation & decreased conformational flexibility added to increased binding affinity.

Despite the observation of increased stimulation, phenyltropanes lack the local anesthetic sodium channel blocking effect that the benzoyloxy imparts to cocaine. Beside topical affect, this gives cocaine an affinity for binding to sites on the dopamine and serotonin sodium dependent transport areas that are distinct & specific to MAT in contrast to the general sodium channels; creating a separate mechanism of relational affinity to the transporters in addition to its inhibition of the reuptake for those transporters; this is unique to the local anesthetic value in cocaine & analogues with a similar substitute for the benzoyloxy that leaves the sodium channel blockage ability intact. Rendering such compounds as different functionally in their relation to MAT contrasted to phenyltropane analogues which have the local anesthetic bridge removed. (Requiring some of the sodium ions to be pumped from the axon via Na+/K+-ATPase). In addition, it even has been postulated that a crucial role regarding the electron energy imparted via voltage sensitization (and thus action potential blockage with a molecule capable of intersecting its specific channel, in the case of cocaine a sodium channel, that potentially serves in re-quantifying its charge) upon a receptor binding site may attenuate the mediating influence of the inhibitory regulation that autoreceptors play by their slowing neurotransmitter release when an efflux is created through an instance of agonism by a compound; allowing said efflux to be continued without the body's attempt to maintain homeostasis enacting in as readily responsive a manner to its conformational change.

3β-Alkylphenyltropane & 3β-Alkenyl analogues

The compound 224e, the 3β-styrene analogue, had the highest potency in its group. While 224b & 224c showed the most selectivity, with 224b having a ten-fold greater potency for the dopamine transporter than cocaine.

6-Alkyl-3-benzyltropane analogues

N.B. The benzylidene derivatives serve as synthetic intermediates for 6-Alkyl-3-benzyltropanes and have not been assayed for biological activity.  Compounds 237a and 238a are the same compound as both are the parent for either series with a hydrogen saturated in their respective substitution place.

Direct 2,3-pyrimidino fused
 
cf. strobamine (at right) for a more efficacious compound as like the below.

"NA" = "no affinity", e.g. unquantifiable.

Direct di-hetero-benzene (pyrimidino) 2,3-fused and thus rigidified cocaine analogs.

Piperidine cocaine-homologues

cf. phenyltropane piperidine-homologues for compounds with a more optimized conformation that yield higher affinities when binding to MAT.

Cocaine hapten analogues

ɑ6-(2R,3S)-3-(benzoyloxy)-8-methyl-8-azabicyclo [3.2.1] octane-2-carbonyloxy-hexanoic acid
b6-(2R,3S)-3-(benzoyloxy)-8-methyl-8-azabicyclo [3.2.1] octane-2-carboxamido-hexanoic acid

Cocaine haptens that create catalytic anti-bodies require transitional states as affected in vivo. Monoclonal antibodies generated against BSA-coupled 402e accelerated the rate of cocaine hydrolysis by ~23,000x and eliminated the reinforcing effects of cocaine administration in rats.

Structural/Functional intermediate analogues

Piperidine Analogues

 JZ-IV-10 (a "Modafinil hybrid" with nocaine. cf. List of modafinil analogues)

 Nocaine

A somewhat recent occurrence among tentative modern folklore which has traversed the circling of rumors mostly confined to the likes of universities and popular culture trivia has been that cocaine is one element, or molecule increment of weight or charge etc., away from the molecular structure of sugar. Though such a statement is false as a general pretense, there is a dextrose based super-structure that has a vaguely similar overlay with cocaine which is "benzoyl-beta-D-glucoside."
Benzoyl-beta-D-glucoside

Benztropine (3α-Diphenylmethoxy Tropane) Analogues

ɑInhibition at 10 μM

The binding of benztropine analogues to the DAT differs significantly from that of cocaine and the phenyltropanes. Benztropines are considered to be "atypical" DAT ligands because they stabilize the DAT in an inward-facing (closed-to-out) conformation, whereas cocaine and the phenyltropanes stabilize the DAT in an outward-facing (open-to-out) conformation.  This difference in DAT binding may be responsible for the lack of cocaine-like behavioral effects observed in animal and human studies of the benztropine analogues and other “atypical” DAT inhibitors.  Studies of the structure-activity relationships of benztropine have shown that DAT affinity and selectivity over other monoamine transporters is enhanced by 4′,4′-difluorination. Modification of the tropane n-substituent was found to mitigate the anticholinergic effects of benztropine analogues by reducing M1 affinity.

Tropanyl Isoxazoline Analogues
 

Compound 7a (3′-methoxy-8-methyl-spiro(8-azabicyclo(3.2.1)octane-3,5′(4′H)-isoxazole) allosterically enhances SERT binding of other reuptake ligands. Compound 7a  construed as a potentiating allosteric effect (by unveiling occluded configured serotonin uptake-area ligand-site on surface of transporter that allows for binding by exogenous ligand, when SERT is otherwise conformed in a transitional manner where a SERT ligand cannot bind, this effect with compound in question occurs) at concentrations of 10μM—30μM (wherein it acts by interconverting the conformational state of unexposed SERTs to ones exposing the SSRI binding site via a shift to the equilibrium of the MAT) while exerting an inhibitory orthosteric effect when concentrations reach >30μM and above.7a is the only known compound to allosterically modulate SERT in such a way within in vitro conditions (tianeptine has been shown to do similar, but has only shown efficacy doing so in living in vivo tissue samples). Considering its noncompetitive inhibition of 5-HT transporters decreasing Vmax with small change in the Km for serotonin, putatively stabilizing the cytoplasm-facing conformation of SERT: in such respect it is considered to have the opposite effect profile of the anti-addiction drug ibogaine (save for the function by which its anti-addictive properties are thought to be mediated, i.e. α3β4 nicotinic channel blockage. cf. 18-Methoxycornaridine for such nicotinergic activity without the likewise SERT affinity).Compound 11a possesses similar effects, but acts on the DAT. Similarly, such peripheral DAT considerations (when, as often is, considered conformational rather than otherwise explained as being electrostatic) may constitute the difference in affinity, through allosertic occulsion, between cyclopentyl-ruthenium phenyltropane in its difference from the tricarbonyl-chromium

Alicyclic Amine Analogues

Dihydroimidazoles

See: List of Mazindol analogues

Mazindol is usually considered a non-habituating (in humans, and some other mammals, but is habituating for e.g. Beagles) tetracyclic dopamine reuptake inhibitor (of somewhat spurious classification in the former).

It is a loosely functional analog used in cocaine research; due in large part to N-Ethylmaleimide being able to inhibit approximately 95% of the specific binding of [3H]Mazindol to the residues of the MAT binding site(s), however said effect of 10 mM N-Ethylmaleimide was prevented in its entirety by just 10 μM cocaine. Whereas neither 300 μM dopamine or D-amphetamine afforded sufficient protection to contrast the efficacy of cocaine.

Local anesthetics (not usually CNS stimulants)
 
In animal studies, certain of the local anesthetics have displayed residual dopamine reuptake inhibitor properties, although not normally ones that are easily available. These are expected to be more cardiotoxic than phenyltropanes. For example, dimethocaine has behavioral stimulant effects (and therefore not here listed below) if a dose of it is taken that is 10 times the amount of cocaine. Dimethocaine is equipotent to cocaine in terms of its anesthetic equivalency. Intralipid "rescue" has been shown to reverse the cardiotoxic effects of sodium channel blockers and presumably those effects when from cocaine administered intravenously as well.

See also

 Coca alkaloids, the ones relating to cocaine biosynthesis include: benzoylecgonine, ecgonidine, ecgonine, hydroxytropacocaine, methylecgonine cinnamate, tropacocaine & truxilline
 Cocaine metabolites (Human), which include: benzoylecgonine (BE), ecgonine methyl ester (EME), ecgonine, norcocaine, p-hydroxycocaine, m-hydroxycocaine, p-hydroxybenzoylecgonine (pOHBE) & m-hydroxybenzoylecgonine
 Dopaminergics
 Federal Analog Act
 Pharmacophore
 Pharmacopoeia
 Pharmacokinetics
 Pharmacodynamics

Common analogues to prototypical D-RAs:
Substituted amphetamines
Substituted cathinones
Substituted phenethylamines
Substituted phenylmorpholines
Substituted methylenedioxyphenethylamines

Notes (inclu. specific locations of citations from within references used)

References

External links

 U. S. Provisional Patent Application listing examples of compounds which are tropanes for prospective use in research
 Article on cocaine analogue research
 List of tropanyl type molecules and their CAS Registry Numbers

Cocaine
Local anesthetics
Euphoriants
Carboxylate esters
Methyl esters
Tropanes
Chemical classes of psychoactive drugs